Huzhou or Hu Prefecture (湖州) was a zhou (prefecture) in imperial China, centering on modern Huzhou, Zhejiang, China. It existed (intermittently) from 602 until 1912. Between 1225 and 1276 it was known as Anji Prefecture (安吉州).

The modern prefecture-level city, created in 1983, retains its name.

Geography
The administrative region of Hu Prefecture in the Tang dynasty is under the administration of modern Huzhou in northern Zhejiang. It probably includes parts of modern: 
Huzhou
Anji County
Changxing County
Deqing County

Population
In the early 1100s during the Song dynasty, there were 162,335 households and 361,698 people.

See also
Wuxing Commandery

References

 
 

Prefectures of the Qing dynasty
Prefectures of the Ming dynasty
Prefectures of the Yuan dynasty
Prefectures of the Tang dynasty
Prefectures of the Sui dynasty
Prefectures of Wuyue
Liangzhe West Circuit
Former prefectures in Zhejiang